XHTF-FM is a radio station on 100.3 FM in Monclova, Coahuila, known as Estéreo Tiempo.

History
XHTF received its concession on February 16, 1982. It was owned by Humberto Medina Ainslie with an ERP of 10 kW. It was sold to Martínez Ramón in 1986.

References

Radio stations in Coahuila